The Co-operative Party is a centre-left political party in the United Kingdom, supporting co-operative values and principles. Established in 1917, the Co-operative Party was founded by co-operative societies to campaign politically for the fairer treatment of co-operative enterprise and to elect 'co-operators' to Parliament. The party's roots lie in the Parliamentary Committee of the Co-operative Union established in 1881.

Since 1927, the Co-operative Party has had an electoral pact with the Labour Party, with both parties agreeing not to stand candidates against each other. Instead, candidates selected by members of both parties contest elections using the description of Labour and Co-operative Party. The Co-operative Party is a legally separate entity from the Labour Party, and is registered as a political party with the Electoral Commission. Co-operative Party members are not permitted to be members of any other political party in the UK apart from the Labour Party or Northern Ireland's Social Democratic and Labour Party (SDLP).

The Co-operative Party is de jure the fourth-largest party in the House of Commons with 25 Members of Parliament, although as all of its MPs sit in the Parliamentary Labour Party, this distinction is seldom made. It also has representatives in the House of Lords, the Scottish Parliament, the Senedd, the London Assembly and local government.

In keeping with its co-operative values and principles, the Co-operative Party does not have a leader. Instead Joe Fortune serves as General Secretary, Preet Kaur Gill serves as Chair of the Co-operative Party Parliamentary Group, and Jim McMahon as Chair of the Co-operative Party National Executive Committee.

History
The Co-operative Party was formed in 1917 after being approved by the May Congress of the British co-operative movement held in Swansea. Since an electoral pact established in 1927, the party has stood joint candidates with the Labour Party. In 1938, a written constitution was adopted by the Co-operative Party which formalised links between the two parties, and in 1946 Co-operative candidates first stood in elections under the Labour Co-operative banner.

In its formative years the Co-operative Party was almost exclusively concerned with the trading and commercial problems of the co-operative movement. Since the 1930s, it has widened its emphasis, using influence gained through strong links with the political and commercial left to spread what it sees as co-operative ethos and moral principles. The basic principles underpinning the party are to seek recognition for co-operative enterprises, recognition for the social economy, and to advance support for co-operatives and co-operation across Europe and the developing world. The party stands for a sustainable economy and society, a culture of citizenship and socially responsible business represented by the practice of retail and industrial co-operatives. The Co-operative Party seeks to advance its agenda through the Parliamentary Labour Party, with whom it shares common values.

Joint Parliamentary Committee
The Joint Parliamentary Committee was set up in 1881 by The Co-operative Union. It was primarily a watchdog on parliamentary activities. Issues and legislation could be raised in the House of Commons only by lobbying sympathetic, usually Labour, MPs. As it was somewhat unsatisfactory to have to lobby MPs on each individual issue, motions were passed at the Co-operative Union Annual Congress urging direct parliamentary representation. However, for much of this early period societies would not commit funds.

First World War
At the start of the war, the many retail societies in the co-operative movement grew in both membership and trade; this was due, in part, because of their very public anti-profiteering stance. When conscription was introduced and food and fuel supplies restricted, these societies began to suffer. The movement was under-represented on the various governmental distribution committees and tribunals. Co-operatives received minimal supplies and even management were often drafted, whereas business opponents were able to have even clerks declared vital for the war effort. Societies were also required to pay excess profits tax, although their co-operative nature meant they made no profits.

A motion was tabled at the 1917 Congress held in Swansea by the Joint Parliamentary Committee and 104 retail societies, calling for direct representation at national and local government levels. The motion was passed by 1979 votes to 201.

Central Co-operative Parliamentary Representation Committee
An Emergency Political Conference was held on 18 October 1917. As a result, the Central Co-operative Parliamentary Representation Committee was formed in 1917, with the objective of putting co-operators into the House of Commons. This was soon renamed the Co-operative Party. The first national secretary was Samuel Perry, later a Member of Parliament and the father of Fred Perry.

At first the party put forward its own candidates. The first was H. J. May, later Secretary of the International Co-operative Alliance, who was unsuccessful at the January 1918 Prestwich by-election. Ten then stood in the 1918 general election. One candidate met with success, Alfred Waterson, who became a Member of Parliament for the Kettering seat. Waterson took the Labour whip in Parliament. In 1919, 151 Co-operative Party councillors were elected at local level. Waterson retired from Parliament in 1922, but four new Co-operative MPs were elected that same year, including A.V. Alexander, all of whom took the Labour whip. Six were elected in 1923 and five in 1924.

However, since the 1927 Cheltenham Agreement, the party has had an electoral agreement with the Labour Party, which allows for a limited number of Labour Co-operative candidates. This means that the parties involved do not oppose each other. The agreement has been amended several times, most recently in 2003, which was made in the name of the Co-operative Party rather than the Co-operative Union. After the formal agreement, nine Labour Co-operative MPs were elected at the 1929 general election, and Alexander was made a cabinet minister. However, only one was returned at the 1931 election against the backdrop of a massive defeat for Labour.

The rise of the sister party
Labour's recovery as a credible party of government during World War II and the formal links and local affiliations brought by the 1927 agreement saw benefits electorally for the Co-operative Party. In 1945, 23 Labour Co-operative MPs were elected and two held high office in the Labour government – Alexander and Alfred Barnes, who had been chair of the party.

But with Labour's fluctuating fortunes and the slow post-war decline of the co-operative movement, the party saw its influence and standing fall. By 1983, another nadir for Labour fortunes, only eight Labour Co-operative MPs were elected.

However, in 1997, all 23 candidates won seats in Parliament and, after Labour assumed power, the party gained its first members of the Cabinet since AV Alexander: Alun Michael 1998–99 (later First Minister for Wales) and Ed Balls 2007–2010. In 2001, only one candidate was defeated: Faye Tinnion, who had stood against the Leader of the Conservative Party, William Hague.

Organisation and structure
The Co-operative Party is a membership organisation consisting of individual members as well as local, regional and national Co-operative Parties and affiliated co-operative societies and trade unions. Unlike other parties with representatives elected to Parliament, the Co-operative Party does not receive state funding and gets most of its income from membership subscriptions and affiliation fees.

The Party's highest decision making body is the National Executive Committee (NEC), which is elected every three years by individual members, affiliated co-operatives and trade unions, the Co-operative Party Parliamentary Group, and Co-operatives UK.

An Annual Conference takes place each autumn to debate policy, discuss the Party's work and vote on motions, although its resolutions are only advisory on the NEC.

The Co-operative Party Parliamentary Group co-ordinates the work of the Party's MPs and Peers in Parliament.

Affiliates
Six of the UK's largest consumer co-operatives are affiliated to the Co-operative Party: the Co-operative Group, Midcounties Co-operative, Central England Co-operative, East of England Co-operative, Scotmid Co-operative and Chelmsford Star Co-operative.

The members of each co-operative society vote to approve affiliation to the Party at their annual general meeting. The largest society and funder of the Party is the Co-operative Group, which ballots its members each year on continued support for the Co-operative Party. At the May 2019 AGM, 79% of Co-operative Group members voted in favour of continued affiliation and that year donated £625,600 (2018: £625,600) to the Co-operative Party.

In 2016 Community became the first trade union to affiliate to the Co-operative Party, followed in 2018 by the Union of Shop, Distributive and Allied Workers (Usdaw).

Co-operatives UK, Co-operative Press and a number of worker co-operatives and housing co-operatives are also organisational members of the Party.

Local structure
The local structure of the Co-operative Party's is based on autonomous units known as Society Co-operative Parties, which operate in a similar way to Constituency Labour Parties (CLPs).

Co-operative societies sponsor Society Co-operative Parties in their traditional areas of operation, which will often take the name of the supporting society (i.e. East of England Co-operative Party and East of England Co-operative).

Society Co-operative Parties usually have a number of branches covering one or more local authority area, which are the main way that individual members interact with the Party to debate policy, select candidates for elections and liaise with Constituency Labour Parties. The Society Co-operative Party is overseen by a party council made up of delegates from branches and the supporting co-operative society.

Scotland, Wales and Northern Ireland each have a single national Society Co-operative Party. In England a local party will cover one or more county, or in some cases a full region.

Labour and Co-operative Party

The Co-operative Party and Labour Party have had an electoral alliance known as the 'National Agreement' since 1927, meaning they do not stand against each other in elections. Instead both parties agree joint candidates to stand as Labour and Co-operative Party.

Labour and Co-operative candidates can stand at elections at all levels in England, Scotland and Wales. Although both parties organise in Northern Ireland, they do not stand candidates for election.

As a sister party, the Co-operative Party has a unique relationship with the Labour Party meaning it does not affiliate at a UK level. Instead local Society Co-operative Parties affiliate to Constituency Labour Parties, which facilitates local co-operation and the selection of joint candidates.

Most candidates use the Labour and Co-operative Party description on their ballot paper, however some stand under another version, particularly for local government elections and elections in Scotland, Wales and London that use a list system. In this case only one description will be used to avoid voters thinking Labour and Co-operative candidates are standing against Labour candidates; however joint candidates are still recognised as part of the Labour and Co-operative Group if they are elected.

Although only the Labour Party emblem is used on the ballot paper, candidates and representatives can use a joint logo on their printed materials and websites.

Leadership
The Co-operative Party does not have a single leader, with the responsibilities shared between Jim McMahon as Chair of the National Executive Committee, Preet Kaur Gill as Chair of the Co-operative Party Parliamentary Group, and Joe Fortune as General Secretary, who oversees the day-to-day operations of the Party.

Chairs of the Co-operative Party
1918–1924 William Henry Watkins
1924–1945 Alfred Barnes MP
1945–1955 William Coldrick MP
1955–1957 Albert Ballard
1957–1965 James Peddie
1965–1972 Herbert Kemp CSD, JP
1972–1978 John Parkinson
1978–1982 Tom Turvey JP
1982–1989 Brian Hellowell
1989–1995 Jessie Carnegie
1995–1996 Peter Nurse
1996–2001 Jim Lee
2001–2019 Gareth Thomas MP
2019–2019 Anna Turley MP (June–December)
2019–2020 Chris Herries
2020–present Jim McMahon MP

General Secretaries of the Co-operative Party
1917–1942 Samuel Perry
1942–1962 Jack Bailey
1962–1967 Harold Campbell
1967–1974 Ted Graham
1974–1992 David Wise
1992–1998 Peter Clarke
1998–2008 Peter Hunt
2008–2012 Michael Stephenson
2012–2015 Karin Christiansen
2015–2019 Claire McCarthy
2019–present Joe Fortune

Electoral representation
The modern party is the political arm of the wider British co-operative movement and membership of another co-operative enterprise is a requirement for candidates. Co-operative members who wish to stand for election must also be members of the Labour Party, and stand as Labour and Co-operative Party candidates.

Electoral performance

House of Commons
There are 26 Labour and Co-operative MPs in the House of Commons.

House of Lords
There are sixteen Labour and Co-operative peers in the House of Lords:
Lord Bassam of Brighton
Lord Coaker of Gedling
Lord Foulkes of Cumnock
Lord Hain
Baroness Hayter of Kentish Town
Lord Hunt of Kings Heath
Lord Kennedy of Southwark
Lord Knight of Weymouth
Lord McAvoy
Lord Monks
Baroness Royall of Blaisdon
Baroness Smith of Basildon
Baroness Thornton
Lord Tomlinson
Lord Touhig
Baroness Wilcox of Newport

Lord McFall of Alcluith currently sits as a non-affiliated peer following his election as Lord Speaker in May 2021.

Senedd
There are sixteen Labour and Co-operative Members of the Senedd:

Scottish Parliament
There are eleven Labour and Co-operative Members of the Scottish Parliament:

London Assembly 
There are eleven Labour and Co-operative Members of the London Assembly:

Police and Crime Commissioners
There are seven Labour and Co-operative Police and Crime Commissioners:

Directly elected Mayors 

There are five directly elected Labour and Co-operative metro mayors:

There are three directly elected Labour and Co-operative local authority mayors:

Local government 
The Co-operative Party is represented in all tiers of local government by local councillors who stand as Labour and Co-operative. There are 938 Labour and Co-operative Councillors across England, Scotland and Wales. In London, there are 271 Labour and Co-operative councillors and Greenwich has the highest number in the capital with 39 councillors.

Northern Ireland Assembly
The Co-operative party is affiliated with the Labour Party in Northern Ireland. Labour and SDLP members are permitted to join the party, but it does not currently have any representation in the Northern Ireland Assembly.

See also
 List of Labour Co-operative Members of Parliament
 Co-operative Party election results
 Rochdale Principles
 British co-operative movement

References

Further reading
Consumers in politics, a history and general review of the Co-operative Party (1969), Thomas F. Carbery, Manchester U.P.
Serving the People: Co-operative Party History from Fred Perry to Gordon Brown. (2007), Greg Rosen, London: Co-operative Party. .

External links

The National Co-operative Archive holds records relating to the Co-operative Party.
Co-operative Party Wales Papers at the National Library of Wales

 
Labour Party (UK)
Political parties established in 1917
Organisations associated with the Labour Party (UK)
Social democratic parties in the United Kingdom
1917 establishments in the United Kingdom